The discography of the English rock band, Embrace. The band's highest charting single is "Nature's Law", which reached number two on the UK Singles Chart in 2006. The albums This New Day, Out of Nothing and The Good Will Out all reached number one on the UK Albums Chart.

Albums

Studio albums

Compilation albums

Extended plays

Singles

Video albums
 Fireworks: The Singles 1997–2002 
 SG 14 Live In Majorca
 Embrace – A Glorious Day Live in Leeds (2005)

Other appearances
"Forever Young" (performed live at Royal Albert Hall)

References

Discographies of British artists
Rock music group discographies